Heume-l'Église is a commune in the Puy-de-Dôme department in Auvergne-Rhône-Alpes in central France.

The village mainly consists of a collection of farmhouses, it is a small rural community with approx. 160 occupants.
The word "Eglise" translates into "church", there is a church in Heume l'Eglise which served as church for the entire rural community in the surrounding area.

See also
Communes of the Puy-de-Dôme department

References

Heumeleglise